Microcentrum rhombifolium is a species of insect in the family Tettigoniidae. Common names include greater angle-wing katydid, broad-winged katydid, and angular-winged katydid. They live across North America in trees and shrubs. Adults reach 50-65 mm in length and are rhombus-shaped. Their green coloration mimics leaves. Adults are active in late summer and autumn and have a "ticking" call.

References

Further reading
 
 Field Guide To Grasshoppers, Katydids, And Crickets Of The United States, Capinera, Scott, Walker. 2004. Cornell University Press.
 Otte, Daniel (1997). Tettigonioidea. Orthoptera Species File 7, 373.

External links
NCBI Taxonomy Browser, Microcentrum rhombifolium

Phaneropterinae
Insects described in 1859